Mutualism may refer to:

 Mutualism (biology), positive interactions between species
 Mutualism (economic theory), associated with Pierre-Joseph Proudhon
 Mutualism (movement), social movement promoting mutual organizations
 Mutualism model of human intelligence

See also 
 Mutual (disambiguation)